The passamezzo moderno ("modern half step"; also quadran, quadrant, or quadro pavan), or Gregory Walker was "one of the most popular harmonic formulae in the Renaissance period, divid[ing] into two complementary strains thus:"

For example, in C major the progression is as follows:

{|class="wikitable" style="text-align:center" width=520
|width=63|C||width=55|F||width=55|C||width=55|G||width=55|C||width=55|F||width=80|C–G||width=65|C
|}

The progression or ground bass, the major mode variation of the passamezzo antico, originated in Italian and French dance music during the first half of the 16th century, where it was often used with a contrasting progression or section known as ripresi. Though one of Thomas Morley's characters in Plaine and Easie Introduction to Practicall Musicke denigrates the Gregory Walker, comparing unskilled singing to its sound, it was popular in both pop/popular/folk and classical musics through 1700. Its popularity was revived in the mid 19th century, and the American variant (below) evolved into the twelve bar blues.

Examples

Listed in :
several in The Fitzwilliam Virginal Book
"Up and Ware Them A Willie"
"Jimmie Rose"
"Darling Nelly Gray"
"Wreck of the Old 97"
Woody Guthrie's "There is a House in This Old Town"
Irving Berlin's "Alexander's Ragtime Band"
The Rolling Stones' "Honky Tonk Women" (1969)
Carole King's "You've Got a Friend" (1971)

Listed in :
Hans Neusidler's Gassenhauer (Nuremberg, 1536)
"Oxstedter Mühle" (folk dance from Lower Saxony) (B section)
Diego Ortiz' Recercada Prima / Segunda / Tercera sobre el Passamezzo Moderno (three-part didactic composition in Tratado de Glosas sobre cláusulas y Otros Generos de Puntos en la Música de Violones, 1553). (Readers of Spanish may benefit from the Spanish-language Wikipedia's more extensive treatment of Diego Ortiz and of the Tratado de Glosas.)

Others:
Iron & Wine's "A History of Lovers" (verses; chorus and interludes follow ripresi IV–I–IV–V progression)
Ed Rush and George Cromarty’s "Plastic Jesus"

American Gregory Walker
The American Gregory Walker, popular in parlour music, is a variation in which the subdominant (IV) chords become the progression IV–I.

{|class="wikitable" style="text-align:center"
|1)||I||IV–I||I||V
|-
|2)||I||IV–I||I–V||I
|}

For example, in C major this variation is as follows:

{|class="wikitable" style="text-align:center" width=515
|width=50|C||width=65|F–C||width=50|C||width=45|G||width=50|C||width=65|F–C||width=65|C–G||width=55|C
|}

Examples
Listed in :
"Jesse James"
"The Titanic"
"My Little Old Sod Shanty"
"Cottonfields"
Gus Cannon's "Walk Right In" (1929)

Other variations

On original progression

Second strain's first I becomes I–I7 (for a stronger "lead-in" to the upcoming IV):
"Gathering Flowers From the Hillside": The Bluegrass variation frequently occurs in conjunction with the I–I7 "lead-in" and/or the direct IV-to-V transition listed above.The resulting progression is  ||| I | I | I | V || I(–I7) | IV | (I–)V | I ||| ; examples include:
"Free Little Bird" (David Holt and Doc and Merle Watson; not to be confused with Lynyrd Skynyrd's "Free Bird").

On American variant
IV–I is reversed, becoming I–IV or I7–IV:
"Tennessee Waltz" (Stewart and King 1947) (verse and second strain of chorus)

Notes

References

Further reading
 Anon. n.d. "Coming 'round the Mountain". Song text, at Leader in Lieder mit Midi Melodies website (accessed 22 May 2010)

Chord progressions